Manakambahiny Ankavia is a rural municipality in northern Madagascar. It belongs to the district of Antalaha, which is a part of Sava Region. The municipality has a populations of 7,830  inhabitants (2019).

Agriculture
The agriculture is mainly substancial: rice, manioc, banana, sugar cane, next to vanilla, cloves and coffee are planted.

Tourism
It is situated at the border of the Masoala National Park on the river Ankavia.

References 

Populated places in Sava Region